Peter Pursell (1 July 1894 – 14 August 1968) was a Scottish footballer. A defender, he won one cap for Scotland in 1914. He was the younger brother of Robert Russell Pursell, and the father of Robert Wilson Pursell.

He began his senior career at Queens Park, before joining Rangers in 1914. He helped the club to the league title in 1917–18 and 1918–19, before he signed with English club Port Vale for a £2,500 fee in August 1919. He spent five years with the Vale, before joining Wigan Borough for a two-year spell. He later became player-manager at non-league side Congleton Town and then manager at Dutch outfit Dordrecht.

Club career

Queens Park
Pursell played for Campbeltown Academicals and played for one season with Queens Park. He made his Scottish Division One debut on 16 August 1913, in a 4–0 defeat at Dumbarton. He featured 21 times throughout the 1913–14 campaign.

Rangers
He joined Rangers in 1914. He made 31 appearances in 1914–15, as the club finished third in Scottish Division One. He played 20 games in 1915–16, as the Gers finished second behind Old Firm rivals Celtic. The Ibrox Park club again finished third in 1916–17, before winning the league title in 1917–18, with Pursell making 24 appearances. He featured 23 times in 1918–19, as Rangers retained the league title.

Port Vale
He joined Port Vale for a £2,500 fee in August 1919. When Vale were elected to the Football League two months later, the club had to fork out an extra £500 to Rangers for the services of Pursell and Willie Aitken. He played 49 of the club's 51 games in 1919–20, and also helped Vale to lift the Staffordshire Senior Cup and North Staffordshire Infirmary Cup. He played alongside brother Bob in 1920–21, making 34 Second Division appearances. He featured 32 times in 1921–22, though his brother was forced to retire with a broken leg. Pursell featured 42 times in 1922–23 and 25 times in 1923–24, before leaving The Old Recreation Ground for Wigan Borough at the end of the campaign. Pursell played a total of 183 matches for the Vale without finding the net.

Wigan Borough
He played 35 Third Division North games for Wigan, helping the club to finish 11th in 1924–25 and 17th in 1925–26.

International career
Pursell received his sole Scotland cap on 28 February 1914, in a British Home Championship match against Wales which ended in a 0–0 draw.

Managerial career
After leaving Wigan Borough, Pursell became player-manager of Congleton Town and also managed Dutch club Dordrecht.

Career statistics
Source:

Honours
Rangers
Scottish Football League: 1917–18, 1918–19

Port Vale
Staffordshire Senior Cup: 1920
North Staffordshire Infirmary Cup: 1920, 1922

References

1894 births
1968 deaths
People from Campbeltown
Sportspeople from Argyll and Bute
Scottish footballers
Scotland international footballers
Association football defenders
Queen's Park F.C. players
Rangers F.C. players
Port Vale F.C. players
Wigan Borough F.C. players
Congleton Town F.C. players
Scottish Football League players
English Football League players
Association football player-managers
Scottish football managers
Scottish expatriate football managers
Expatriate football managers in the Netherlands
FC Dordrecht managers